Naila Boss is an English underground rapper from Hackney, London.

Discography

Singles
 "It Can't Be Right" (2004) - UK No. 8 (with 2play and Raghav)
 "La La La" (2004) - UK No. 65
 "You Should Really Know" (2004) - UK No. 8 (with The Pirates, Shola Ama, Ishani and Enya)

References

External links
 BBC Radio 1Xtra interview

Year of birth missing (living people)
English people of Nigerian descent
Living people
Black British women rappers
Underground rappers
English women rappers
Rappers from London